Datnioides microlepis, also known as the Indonesian tiger perch, Indo datmoid, Indonesian tigerfish, or finescale tigerfish, is a species of freshwater fish endemic to the Malay Peninsula and Indonesia (Sumatra and Kalimantan). Previous records from the Chao Phraya and Mekong rivers is due to confusion with the D. pulcher (Siamese tigerfish), which was included in D. microlepis until 1998.

References

Freshwater fish of Malaysia
Freshwater fish of Indonesia
Percoidei